It Ain't 4 Play is the only studio album released by American hip hop group Funk Mobb. It was released July 15, 1996 via Sick Wid It/Jive Records. Production was handled by K-Lou, Studio Ton, LeVitti, Kevin Gardner, Redwine, Stevie Dee, and Funk Mobb, with E-40 and B-Legit serving as executive producers. It features guest appearances from B-Legit, Little Bruce, Smitty, Levitti, Double OJK, Gangsta P, and Poo-Miller. The album peaked at number 46 on the Billboard Top R&B/Hip-Hop Albums and at number 28 on the Billboard Top Heatseekers. The song "It's Time to Mobb" originally appeared on the Sick Wid' It Records 1995 compilation The Hogg in Me. The album was supported with the single "I Wanna See Ya".

Track listing

Sample credits
Track 1 contains an interpolation of "8th Wonder" written by Ronald LaPread and Cheryl Cook
Track 14 contains a portion of the composition "Bustin' Out" written by Rick James
Track 15 contains a portion of the composition "Jam on It" written by Maurice Benjamin Cenac

Personnel

DeShawn "Mac Shawn" Dawson – vocals, keyboards, drum programming, producer, mixing
Clifton "G-Note" Dickson – vocals, co-producer, mixing
K-1 – vocals, co-producer
Brandt "B-Legit" Jones – vocals, executive producer
"Little Bruce" Thurmon – vocals
Smitty – vocals
Anton "Gangsta P" Barrett Sr. – vocals
Double OJK – vocals
Poo-Miller – vocals
Lewis "Levitti" King – backing vocals, keyboards, drum programming, producer, mixing
Pleasure – backing vocals
Ken "K-Lou" Franklin – keyboards, drum programming, producer, mixing, engineering
Marvin "Studio Ton" Whitemon – keyboards, drum programming, producer, mixing, engineering
Kevin Gardner – keyboards, drum programming, producer
Robert Redwine – producer
Steve Davison – keyboards, drum programming, producer
Dannell "D-Shot" Stevens – co-producer
Tom Brick – mastering
Earl "E-40" Stevens – executive producer
Keba Konte – photography
Phunky Phat Graph-X – design

Charts

References

External links

1996 debut albums
Albums produced by Studio Ton
Funk Mobb albums
Jive Records albums
Lil Italy albums
Sick Wid It Records albums